Takehito Kanazawa (金澤 健人, born January 12, 1979, in Kitaibaraki, Ibaraki) is a Japanese professional baseball pitcher for the Fukuoka SoftBank Hawks in Japan's Nippon Professional Baseball. He previously played for the Hanshin Tigers from 2001 to 2006, the Hokkaido Nippon-Ham Fighters in 2007 and 2008, and the Orix Buffaloes in 2009.

External links

NPB stats

1979 births
Fukuoka SoftBank Hawks players
Hanshin Tigers players
Hokkaido Nippon-Ham Fighters players
Japanese baseball players
Living people
Nippon Professional Baseball pitchers
Orix Buffaloes players
Baseball people from Ibaraki Prefecture